Hilarotes is a genus of beetles in the family Buprestidae, containing the following species:

 Hilarotes chalcoptera (Jacquelin du Val, 1857)
 Hilarotes mannerheimii (Mannerheim, 1837)
 Hilarotes nitidicollis (Laporte & Gory, 1837)

References

Buprestidae genera